Metadata is the name of a US corporation and a registered trademark in the United States.

Though the term "metadata" has a common generic use in information technology, claims of trademark have since brought about legal threats against its use in the generic sense.

History
The word Metadata was registered in 1986 as a trademark (U.S. Trademark Registration No. 1,409,206) belonging to The Metadata Company.. It was acknowledged that the term was first used in 1981 and the first commercial use tracked to 1982. The trademark was granted incontestable status in 1991. Metadata is a proprietary mark which stands for The Metadata Company.

The Metadata Company has since attempted to threaten people legally into not using the word "metadata" in the generic sense. Many people believe that due to the widespread use of the word "metadata" in the generic sense as "data about data", it is likely that the "Metadata" trademark has entered the public domain by becoming a general term. This was the legal opinion expressed by the Office of the Solicitor of the United States Department of the Interior to the Federal Geographic Data Committee when the latter was threatened by Metadata's lawyers for its use of the word "metadata" in a generic sense. However, no judge has as yet ruled the trademark invalid.

References

External links
 Official website

Companies based in Tennessee